Jemal Abdu is an Eritrean footballer who last played for the Western Strikers in the FFSA Super League.

Club career
In 2011, he signed with FFSA Super League club Croydon Kings after being granted political asylum by the Australian government.

International career
Abdu played in the 2009 CECAFA Cup in Kenya, appearing in the 2–1 group match defeat to Rwanda.

Personal life

Whilst competing in the 2009 CECAFA Cup in Kenya he was part of the Eritrea national football team which failed to return home after competing in the regional tournament in Nairobi. After receiving political asylum from the Australian government, the team moved to Adelaide, Australia.

References

External links
 

Living people
1992 births
Association football midfielders
Eritrean footballers
Eritrean expatriate footballers
Eritrea international footballers
FFSA Super League players
Croydon Kings players
Adelaide Comets FC players
Western Strikers SC players
Expatriate soccer players in Australia
Eritrean refugees
National Premier Leagues players